Adamawa State Polytechnic is a tertiary educational institution in Yola, Adamawa State, Nigeria. It was established in 1991 through a merger of the College of Preliminary Studies Yola and the Staff Development Institute, Numan. 
The new polytechnic provides national diploma programs in computer science, statistics, accountancy, business studies and secretarial studies.
The polytechnic, run by the State government, is accredited by the National Board for Technical Education. The institution has become affiliated with the University of Maiduguri for the purpose of running degree programmes.

History 
In 2007, the polytechnic hired 200 staff of carefully balanced ethnic and religious composition. After working unpaid for two years the group took the state government to court asking for payment of salary and benefits. In December 2009, the chief judge hearing the case advised that those carrying out torture and assault on the lecturers should desist.
In November 2008 a panel reviewing the Polytechnic issued a severely critical report and called on Governor Murtala Nyako to take action to bail the institution out of its academic paralysis. The panel noted that the polytechnic had only three accredited programs out of the 33 it offered, and described "apathy, uneasiness" among staff and "a perception of ethnicity and nepotism."
In December 2009 the State government authorized N20.1 million to be spent on the library complex and the lecturers' residence as well as the school's fencing, which had been abandoned since 2001.

In March 2021, during the course of celebrations after their final examinations, students destroyed facilities in the main campus of the institution. This led to a shutdown of the school on 25 March. The institution was reopened on 26 April 2021. Students were surcharged for the damages, and only those who paid the levies were allowed back to school to finish their examinations or process their results.

Courses offered 
The following are courses offered by the institution;

 Accountancy
 Agricultural and Bio-Environmental Engineering/Technology
 Business Administration and Management
 Civil Engineering
 Computer Science
 Mass Communication
 Mechanical Engineering
 Office Technology and Management
 Public Administration
 Quantity Surveying
 Science Laboratory Technology
 Social Development
 Statistics
 Surveying and Geo-informatics
 Urban and Regional Planning

Campus 
The institution is located in three campuses. The main campus is in Jimeta -Yola, the capital city of Adamawa State.  Jambutu campus is also in Jimeta while the Numan campus is located in the Numan Local Government Area of the State.

Affiliations 
The institution also has affiliations with Ahmadu Bello University, Zaria and Federal University Dutse, Jigawa State.

See also
List of polytechnics in Nigeria

References

Polytechnics in Nigeria
Education in Adamawa State
1991 establishments in Nigeria
Educational institutions established in 1991
Public universities in Nigeria